Carlos Alberto Madeo (born July 31, 1981 in Buenos Aires, Argentina) is an Argentine footballer who plays as a defender for Deportivo Laferrere.

Teams
  1999-2005 Deportivo Morón 177 appearances | 11 goals
  2005-2006 Club Olimpia 13 appearances
  2006 Deportivo Morón 1 appearances
  2007 El Porvenir 15 appearances | 1 goals
  2007-2011 All Boys 71 appearances | 4 goals
  2011-2012 Barracas Central 
  2012-2013 Juventud Unida Universitario 
  2013 Aragua FC 
  2013-2015 Defensores Unidos 
  2015- Deportivo Laferrere

External links
 

1981 births
Living people
Argentine footballers
Argentine expatriate footballers
Association football defenders
Footballers from Buenos Aires